Groat may refer to:
Groat (coin), one of several coins formerly used in the British Isles, British Guiana and the British West Indies
Groat (grain), a form of processed cereal grain
Groat (surname)
Groat Road, a freeway in Edmonton, Alberta Canada
Groat Bridge

See also
Grote (disambiguation)